The 1990–91 Arizona gubernatorial election took place on November 6, 1990, for the post of Governor of Arizona. Incumbent Democratic Governor, Rose Mofford, declined to run for a full term. Republican Fife Symington defeated the Democratic nominee and Mayor of Phoenix Terry Goddard.  Because no candidate received a majority of votes, a runoff election was held later on February 26, 1991, which Symington also won. This is the only election where Arizona used a runoff election. 

Evan Mecham, a former governor who was removed from office in 1988 upon being convicted in his impeachment trial, unsuccessfully ran for another term. This would be the last gubernatorial election until 2018 when the victorious gubernatorial candidate in the state would be of the same party as the incumbent president.

Democratic primary

Candidates

Declared
 Terry Goddard, mayor of Phoenix
 Dave Moss, perennial candidate

Declined
 Rose Mofford, incumbent Governor

Results

Republican primary

Candidates

Declared
 Fife Symington, Real estate developer
 Evan Mecham, former Governor
 Fred Koory, Jr, former State Senator
 Sam Steiger, former U.S. Representative for Arizona
 Bob Barnes, former Governor's aide

Results

General election

Results

Runoff election

Prior to 1992, the Arizona State Constitution required a runoff election for the office of Governor if no candidate received a majority of the votes.  As a result, a runoff election was held on February 28, 1991.

Results

References

1990
1990 United States gubernatorial elections
Gubernatorial